Cham-e Ali Mordani (also Romanized as Cham ʿAlī Mordānī; also known as Cham-e Alimardan) is a village in Tayebi-ye Garmsiri-ye Jonubi Rural District, in the Central District of Kohgiluyeh County, Kohgiluyeh and Boyer-Ahmad Province, Iran. At the 2006 census, its population was 20, in 6 families.

References 

Populated places in Kohgiluyeh County